The following museums and art galleries are located in the city of Oxford, England (with locations), many run by the University of Oxford:

 Ashmolean Museum* (Beaumont Street)
 Bate Collection of Musical Instruments* (St Aldate's)
 Christ Church Picture Gallery* (Christ Church)
 Modern Art Oxford (Pembroke Street)
 Museum of the History of Science* (Broad Street)
 Museum of Oxford (Town Hall)
 Oxford Castle – Unlocked (New Road)
 Oxford University Museum of Natural History* (Parks Road)
 Oxford University Press Museum* (Great Clarendon Street)
 Pitt Rivers Museum* (Science Area)
 Science Oxford (St Clement's)
 The Story Museum (Pembroke Street)
 Weston Library* (Broad Street)

* Museums of the University of Oxford.

See also
 List of attractions in Oxford
 List of museums in Oxfordshire
 List of museums in Cambridge
 Virtual Library museums pages (VLmp), started at Oxford University

References

External links
 

Oxford

Oxford-related lists
Oxford